Edmund Beloin (April 1, 1910 – May 26, 1992) was an American writer of radio, film, and television.

Biography
Beloin was a medical student at New York University when he changed career paths and became a writer in 1931.

Bill Morrow and Beloin were signed to The Jack Benny Program for the 1936–1937 season and remained for seven years. He created the character of Mr. Billingsley, Benny's zany, oft-hungover boarder who frequently made non sequitur remarks. Beloin liked the character so much that he played the role.

He left radio for films around June 1943. He had tried to join the Army, but was rejected on medical grounds.

He worked with Henry Garson for much of his career.

He wrote the films All in a Night's Work, G.I. Blues, Visit to a Small Planet, Don't Give Up the Ship, Paris Holiday, The Sad Sack, My Favorite Spy, The Great Lover, A Connecticut Yankee in King Arthur's Court, and Road to Rio. Garson and he were nominated for a Writers Guild of America Award for best written musical for G.I. Blues.

Beloin wrote for the television shows My Three Sons, Family Affair, The Lucy Show, and Mayberry R.F.D.

Beloin and Garson wrote the Broadway play In Any Language which was performed in fall 1952. It received negative reviews and closed after 45 performances. The television adaptation on Broadway Television Theatre, however, met warmer reception. It also aired as an episode of The Chrysler Theatre.

Beloin died of heart failure in Pompano Beach, Florida, on May 26, 1992. He was survived by a wife, Lynn, and a son, John.

Filmography

Film

Television

References

External links
Edmund Beloin on IMDb

Ed Beloin on the RadioGoldINDEX

1910 births
1992 deaths
American male screenwriters
20th-century American male writers
20th-century American screenwriters